A list of avant-garde and experimental films made before 1930. Though some had dedicated music scores written for them, or were synchronized to records, nearly all of these films were silent. Several of them involve color, through tinting, hand-painting or even photographic color.

See also
 Cinéma pur

References
 Paul Rotha and Roger Manvell, "Movie Parade: A Pictorial Survey of the Cinema" London: The Studio, 1936
 Jay Leyda, "Kino: A History of the Russian and Soviet Film" Princeton University Press, 1983 (originally published in 1960)
 Parker Tyler, "Underground Film: A Critical History" New York: Da Capo Press, 1995 (originally published in 1969)
 David Curtis, "Experimental Cinema" New York: Universe Books, 1970
 P. Adams Sitney, "Visionary Film" New York: Oxford University Press, 1979
 Jan-Christoper Horak, ed., Lovers of Cinema: the first American film avant-garde, 1919–1945. University of Wisconsin Press, 1998.

External links 

 
 

1900s
Avant-garde
Avant-garde
Avant-garde